Vasco Oliveira may refer to:
 Vasco Oliveira (footballer, born 1922)
 Vasco Oliveira (footballer, born 2000)